Route 121 or Highway 121 can refer to multiple roads:

Argentina
 National Route 121

Canada
 New Brunswick Route 121
 Ontario Highway 121
 Prince Edward Island Route 121

Costa Rica
 National Route 121

Japan
 Japan National Route 121

United States
 U.S. Route 121 (proposed)
 U.S. Route 121 (former)
 Alabama State Route 121 (former)
 Arkansas Highway 121
 California State Route 121
 Colorado State Highway 121
 Connecticut Route 121
 Florida State Road 121
 County Road 121A (Alachua County, Florida)
 County Road 121 (Duval County, Florida)
 Georgia State Route 121
 Hawaii Route 121
 Illinois Route 121
 Indiana State Road 121
 K-121 (Kansas highway) (former)
 Kentucky Route 121
 Louisiana Highway 121
 Maine State Route 121
 Maryland Route 121
 Massachusetts Route 121
 M-121 (Michigan highway)
 Minnesota State Highway 121
 County Road 121 (Hennepin County, Minnesota)
 Missouri Route 121
 Nebraska Highway 121
 Nevada State Route 121
 New Hampshire Route 121
 New Hampshire Route 121A
 New Mexico State Road 121
 New York State Route 121
 County Route 121 (Herkimer County, New York)
 County Route 121 (Jefferson County, New York)
 County Route 121 (Montgomery County, New York)
 County Route 121 (Niagara County, New York)
 County Route 121 (Seneca County, New York)
 County Route 121 (Steuben County, New York)
 County Route 121 (Sullivan County, New York)
 North Carolina Highway 121
 Ohio State Route 121
 Pennsylvania Route 121
 Rhode Island Route 121
 South Carolina Highway 121
 Texas State Highway 121
 former 121 Tollway (now Sam Rayburn Tollway)
 Texas State Highway Loop 121
 Texas State Highway Spur 121 (former)
 Farm to Market Road 121
 Utah State Route 121
 Vermont Route 121
 Virginia State Route 121
 Virginia State Route 121 (1923-1926) (former)
 Virginia State Route 121 (1927-1928) (former)
 Virginia State Route 121 (1928-1933) (former)
 Washington State Route 121
 Wisconsin Highway 121

Territories
 Puerto Rico Highway 121